Captain Frank Cecil Ransley  (18 October 1897 – 31 December 1992) was a British World War I flying ace credited with nine aerial victories. He would survive the war to become one of its oldest aces before dying at 95 years of age.

Early life
Frank Cecil Ransley was born in Caversham, Berkshire, England, on 18 October 1897. He first served as a gunner (regimental number 19867) in the Royal Garrison Artillery from 1914.

World War I
On 10 May 1917, Ransley was a cadet appointed to the General List of the Royal Flying Corps as a temporary second lieutenant on probation. He was appointed a flying officer and confirmed in his rank on 29 September.

Ransley was posted to No. 48 Squadron in late 1917 to fly the Bristol F.2b two-seater fighter. His gunner scored an aerial victory for them on 28 January 1918. Ransley scored his second victory personally two months later. He would gain a total of nine victories by 27 June 1918, being appointed a flight commander with the temporary rank of captain on 15 May 1918.

He was awarded the Distinguished Flying Cross in June, though it was not gazetted until 3 August 1918. The citation read:
Lieutenant (temporary Captain) Frank Cecil Ransley.
"This officer displays conspicuous gallantry and skill. On a recent occasion, while on patrol he was attacked by seven enemy scouts; he and his observer drove down two, and by skilful manoeuvre and dash he rallied his formation, which were being driven down, and succeeded in driving off the remaining enemy scouts. He has, in all, destroyed three hostile machines and driven down three others completely out of control."

List of aerial victories

Post-war career
After the war Ransley joined the Prison Service, serving as an Assistant House-master at a Borstal from 1924, and being appointed a House-master in January 1928. In early 1932 he was appointed a Governor (Class IV), and by 12 June 1958, when he was made an Officer of the Order of the British Empire, he was serving as governor of HM Prison Wandsworth.

References
Notes

Bibliography
 

1897 births
1992 deaths
People from Caversham, Reading
Royal Garrison Artillery soldiers
Royal Flying Corps officers
Royal Air Force personnel of World War I
British World War I flying aces
Recipients of the Distinguished Flying Cross (United Kingdom)
Officers of the Order of the British Empire
Military personnel from Reading, Berkshire
British Army personnel of World War I